WD repeat-containing protein 46 is a protein that in humans is encoded by the WDR46 gene.

References

Further reading